Austin Ruse is an American conservative political activist, journalist and author. He is the president of a nonprofit NGO, Center for Family and Human Rights (C-FAM), which has been listed as an anti-LGBT hate group by the Southern Poverty Law Center. Through C-FAM and his own writings, Ruse advocates anti-LGBT and anti-abortion conservative positions, and has advocated for the criminalization of homosexuality.

Career
Around the turn of the millennium, he also was a diplomatic attaché of the Permanent Mission of the Holy See to the United Nations.
In July 2013, Ruse was identified as a convener of a Groundswell coalition meeting among conservative activists and journalists.

In 2017 Ruse published the book Littlest Suffering Souls: Children Whose Short Lives Point Us to Christ, which profiles three devoutly religious children who died after extended periods of illness. Ruse's second book, Fake Science: Exposing the Left's Skewed Statistics, Fuzzy Facts, and Dodgy Data was also published in 2017. Ruse's third book --- The Catholic Case for Trump --- was published by Regnery Publishers just prior to the 2020 United States presidential election.

Ruse was a regular contributor to the media outlet Breitbart and was instrumental in encouraging Steve Bannon to get involved with Vatican reporting, which paved the way for the establishment of Breitbart's Rome bureau.

Awards and honors
In 2004, Ruse and his wife were awarded the John Paul II Award for Advancing the culture of life from the Institute for the Psychological Sciences.

Views and controversies

Anti-left views

Ruse stated that the "hard left, human-hating people that run modern universities... should all be taken out and shot" while hosting a radio talk show on American Family Radio in March 2014. Monsignor Anthony Frontiero, of the St. Joseph Cathedral in Manchester, New Hampshire, resigned from the board of C-FAM because of Ruse's comments. The next day on the same radio program, he described Democrats "get[ting] into the ballot box" as "really dumb ... low-information voters."

After the fallout from his comments, AFR removed Ruse from their airwaves, stated that his views were "un-Christian", and scrubbed all of Ruse's shows from their online archives. Ruse also deactivated his Twitter account. Ruse issued a statement on C-FAM's website later that week in which he said he regretted using the phrase "taken out and shot".

In 2020, Ruse began attacking George Floyd and the Black Lives Matter movement stating that Floyd’s history of drug abuse led directly to his death. Following intervention from one of his publishers, he removed the offensive tweet. However, later he defended the original remark.

Anti-gay views

At the UN, Ruse has worked to overturn the Human Rights Council's decision to investigate violence on the basis of sexual orientation and gender identity. The Advocate has described Ruse as "fanatically anti-gay", stating that he has supported anti-gay legislation backed by Vladimir Putin in Russia as well as the continued criminalization of homosexuality in many African countries. Ruse supports legislation in Russia that criminalizes free speech concerning homosexuality, and has argued that most Americans would like to see a similar approach in the US.

In 2017, Ruse attacked Jesuit priest James Martin on social media for his work that urges gay Catholics to begin conversations with their bishops. Michael Sean Winters described Ruse's attacks as "vulgar and childish", and stated that when it comes to Catholicism, Ruse "seems to adopt the most hurtful interpretations possible and hurls them at the feet of others".

Support for Donald Trump
Ruse has repeatedly publicly expressed his support for Donald Trump. He has stated that Trump "more closely adheres to Catholic social teaching than Joe Biden".

Ruse mocked the speech impediment of a 13-year-old child appearing during the 2020 Democratic Convention on Twitter, drawing a comparison to Donald Trump's past history of mocking people with disabilities. He subsequently claimed he was mocking Biden and claimed, with no basis, the former vice president never had a stutter. One of C-FAM’s board members resigned over the incident.

Personal life
Raised Methodist, Ruse converted to Catholicism. He is a supernumerary member of Opus Dei, a personal prelature of the Catholic Church.

References

External links
Center for Family and Human Rights

Living people
21st-century American diplomats
American activist journalists
American magazine journalists
American nonprofit chief executives
American anti-abortion activists
American people of English descent
American Roman Catholics
Diplomats of the Holy See
Converts to Roman Catholicism from Methodism
Knights of Malta
Knights of the Holy Sepulchre
Year of birth missing (living people)
Opus Dei members